

References 
 

 Gibraltar
Geology of Gibraltar
Gibraltar-related lists